The George Inn in Norton St Philip, Somerset, England, one of a number of establishments that claims to be Britain's oldest tavern, is located in the centre of the village. It was built in the 14th or 15th century and has been designated as a Grade I listed building.

It was originally built as a wool store for Hinton Priory at nearby Hinton Charterhouse and to accommodate travellers and merchants coming to the annual wool fairs that were held in the village from the late 13th century until 1902. Hinton Priory was one of the ten medieval Carthusian houses (charterhouses) in England. It was first established at Hatherop in 1222 by William Longspee, Earl of Salisbury. The monks disliked the location, and on Longspee's death in 1226 they petitioned his countess for a new site to achieve greater solitude. She gave them her manors of Hinton Charterhouse and Norton St Philip and the new house was consecrated at Hinton Charterhouse in May 1232. A licence to sell alcohol at The George is claimed from 1397, which may have been a local licence from the Prior of Hinton Priory as Governmental licences for alehouses were only introduced in 1552.

In the 15th century the timber-framed upper floors were added.

The inn became part of the stage coach route between London and South West England. On 12 June 1668 the noted diarist Samuel Pepys, with his wife and servants, passed through Norton St Philip on their way to Bath from Salisbury.

The inn was later used as the headquarters of Monmouth's army, during the Monmouth Rebellion in 1685, after his retreat from Bath. In the aftermath of the failed rebellion Judge Jeffreys used the George Inn as a courtroom and conducted 12 executions on the village common, as part of the Bloody Assizes.

In 1998 a major programme of restoration was undertaken, funded by the Wadworth Brewery, which included extensive archaeological investigations into the history of the building. This showed that part of the building had been demolished in the 17th century and dendrochronology showed that the roof timbers had been replaced in around 1431. Roof repairs included removing all 29,750 stone slates, 70% of which were able to be reused.

The building has been used as a setting for films such as The Remains of the Day, Tom Jones, and The Canterbury Tales, as well as in the television adaptations of Persuasion by Jane Austen and Moll Flanders by Daniel Defoe.

See also
 List of Grade I listed buildings in Mendip

References

External links

 The George Inn web site

Buildings and structures completed in the 14th century
Grade I listed pubs in Somerset
Grade I listed buildings in Mendip District
Monmouth Rebellion